Dennis Vial (born April 10, 1969) is a Canadian former professional ice hockey player. Vial played in the National Hockey League (NHL) with the New York Rangers, Detroit Red Wings, and Ottawa Senators. He also played in the North American minor leagues and European leagues. He played defence and was known for his toughness.

Career
After playing with the Hamilton Steelhawks in the OHL for 3 years, Vial was drafted by the New York Rangers in the 6th round, 110th overall in the 1988 NHL Entry Draft. That year he went back to the OHL and played with the Niagara Falls Thunder, followed by a year with the Flint Spirits in the IHL for the 1989–1990 season, scoring 35 points in 79 games and registering 351 penalty minutes. Throughout this time Vial established himself as a hard hitting enforcer and defenceman and got the call up midway through the 1990–1991 season to join the Rangers. He played in 21 games before being traded to the Detroit Red Wings that same season, appearing in another 9 games. Vial then split the next two seasons between the Red Wings and the Adirondack Red Wings of the AHL.

Prior to the 1993–1994 season Vial was traded from the Red Wings to the Tampa Bay Lightning. He was left unprotected in the 1993 NHL Expansion Draft and was picked up by the Mighty Ducks of Anaheim a few weeks later. Finally, in Phase II of the Expansion draft Vial was picked up by the Ottawa Senators, with whom he made his greatest NHL impact. With a Senators' lineup scarce in talent, Vial was able to make the team and play full-time, and in 1993-94 he was given the team's Frank Finnigan Award as its most improved player. He led the Senators in penalty minutes, major penalties, and fighting majors. Known as a fearless combatant, Vial's time in Ottawa was highlighted by a long, intense, and often bloody feud with Rob Ray of the divisional rival Buffalo Sabres.

However, Vial's aggressive and all-out playing style resulted in many injuries throughout his career and he played in at least half of the games in a season only twice. His last season in the NHL was 1997–1998.

For the next seven seasons Vial played with a number of minor league teams including two years in England in the BISL. He retired following the 2004–2005 season where he played in the UHL with the Missouri River Otters and Richmond Riverdogs.

Vial remained the Ottawa Senators' all-time penalty minutes leader until being surpassed by Chris Neil.

British Ice Hockey League Brawl/Suspension
In 2001, while a member of the British Ice Hockey League's Sheffield Steelers, Vial incited a much publicized brawl against the Nottingham Panthers which resulted in the league handing out several suspensions totaling 28 games and fines worth £8,400 ($18,750). Vial was suspended for six games and fined £750 ($1,675 Cdn) for numerous offences, including instigating the brawl by cross-checking Nottingham's Greg Hadden, and squirting water at fans in the stands.

Britain's Press Association described the event, which escalated into a 36-man bench clearing brawl, as "one of the worst scenes of violence ever seen at a British ice hockey rink."

Other
Vial currently resides just outside Halifax, Nova Scotia. Vial is the brother-in-law of former player Norm Batherson and the uncle of professional ice hockey player Drake Batherson.

Career statistics

References

External links
 

1969 births
Living people
Adirondack Red Wings players
Binghamton Rangers players
Canadian expatriate ice hockey players in England
Canadian ice hockey defencemen
Chicago Wolves players
Columbia Inferno players
Detroit Red Wings players
Flint Spirits players
Franco-Ontarian people
Hamilton Steelhawks players
Ice hockey people from Ontario
Missouri River Otters players
New York Rangers draft picks
New York Rangers players
Niagara Falls Thunder players
Ottawa Senators players
Richmond RiverDogs players
Sheffield Steelers players
Sportspeople from Sault Ste. Marie, Ontario